Praproče pri Temenici (in older sources also Prapreče) is a small settlement northeast of Šentvid pri Stični in the Municipality of Ivančna Gorica in central Slovenia. The area is part of the historical region of Lower Carniola. The municipality is now included in the Central Slovenia Statistical Region.

Name
The name of the settlement was changed from Praproče to Praproče pri Temenici in 1955. In the past the German name was Prapretshe.

Cultural heritage
Two small roadside chapels in the settlement are dedicated to the Virgin Mary and Saint Anthony of Padua and were built in the early 20th century.

References

External links
Praproče pri Temenici on Geopedia

Populated places in the Municipality of Ivančna Gorica